Kuwashige Giichi (桑重儀一 ; 1883－1943) was a Japanese yōga painter.

Biography 
He studied in France and taught morning class at the Taiheiyōgakai Institute. He became a member of the Ohira Western-style painting association.

References 

1883 births
1943 deaths
Yōga painters
20th-century Japanese painters